Hadiza Aliyu , also known as Hadiza Gabon (born 1 June 1989 in Libreville, Gabon), is a Nigerian professional actress and filmmaker who acts in both Hausa and English movies. Hadiza serves as an ambassador for MTN Nigeria and Indomie noodles company. Hadiza was named best actress at 2013 Best of Nollywood Awards. She has also won the 2nd Kannywood/MTN Awards in the year 2014. She presently serves as the founder of HAG Foundation.

Early life and family
Hadiza Aliyu was born on June 1, 1989, in Libreville, Gabon. She is the elder statesman's daughter, Malam Aliyu. Hadiza Aliyu is of Gabonese descent on her father's side and Fulani ancestry from Adamawa State, Nigerian on her mother's side. Hadiza Aliyu attended primary and secondary schools in her birth country where she took her A-Level exams with the goal of becoming a lawyer, and she later chose Law as her preferred degree course. She began her university year as a student, but had to withdraw due to some issues that hampered her studies. Hadiza's education was halted at the time, allowing her to pursue a diploma program in French language and later work as a French-language teacher in a private school.

Acting career
Hadiza Aliyu joined Kannywood after arriving in Nigeria from Gabon. She relocated from Adamawa to Kaduna after deciding to join the Kannywood film industry with her cousin. Hadiza Aliyu met Ali Nuhu a few days after arriving in Kaduna and asked for his help in becoming an actress. Hadiza made her debut in Artabu in 2009, and she quickly rose to prominence as one of the leading female stars in the Hausa film industry.

Hadiza Aliyu, like Ali Nuhu, Sani Musa Danja, Yakubu Muhammed, Maryam Booth, and Rahama Sadau, decided to join Nollywood in 2017. She appeared in her first Nollywood film, Lagos Real Fake Life., alongside Mike Ezuruonye, Mark Angel, and Emmanuella.

Scandal 
As a recognised actress, in 2019 The chief magistrate court orders the arrest of Aliyu over failure to appear in court to clear allegations against her by her colleage Mustapha Naburaska. 

Late 2022, Aliyu was also accused of breaking a promise she made to a man called Bala Musa, a civil servant at his late forties. He stated that they were on agreement to marry each other after spending N396,000 on her, but she refused after all. At the end she confirmed not to know the man at all. 

Aliyu has never gotten married, the daughter that has been said to be hers, is confirmed to be her niece. The daughter of her sister, Maryam Gabon.

Filmography
List of films by Hadiza Aliyu

Honors and awards

Hadiza Aliyu received several awards and honors including 2013 Best of Nollywood Awards and 2nd Kannywood/MTN Awards in 2014. In recognition of her distinguished career as an actress, Hadiza Aliyu was awarded an honor in 2013 by the former Governor of Kano State, Dr. Rabiu Musa Kwankwaso. She was also awarded by African Hollywood Awards as Best Actress

Awards
List of awards received by Hadiza Aliyu

Honors
List of honors received by Hadiza Aliyu;

Brand ambassador
In December 2018, Hadiza Aliyu was unveiled by NASCON Allied Plc, a subsidiary of the Dangote Group as Dangote Classic Seasoning's brand ambassador during the official launch of the seasoning product in Kano

Charitable activities
In 2016, Hadiza Aliyu founded a charitable organization called HAG Foundation Aimed at improving the lives of ordinary people by way of providing help in the educational and healthcare sectors as well as food security.

In March 2016, Hadiza Aliyu visited an internally displaced persons camps in Kano State where she donated food items, textile materials and other tangible items needed by the camp's inhabitants displaced by the northern Nigerian violence.

References

External links
 
 HAG Foundation official website 

1989 births
Nigerian film actresses
Hausa-language mass media
Living people
Actresses in Hausa cinema
21st-century Nigerian actresses
Gabonese emigrants to Nigeria
Nigerian Fula people
Nigerian people of Gabonese descent
Kannywood actors
Nigerian film producers
People from Adamawa State